E.S. Dwarakadasa was formerly professor in the Department of Metallurgy at the Indian Institute of Science, Bangalore, and is currently the CEO & MD, Karnataka Hybrid Micro Devices Ltd. He was elected in 1998 to the Indian National Academy of Engineering.

Selected awards and recognition
 1990 Metallurgist of the year, IISc
 1997 Zinc Gold Medal, Indian Institute of Metals
 1998 Fellowship of the Indian National Academy of Engineering
 1998 Member, Editorial Advisory Board, Anti-Corrosion Methods and Materials
 1995-97 President of IISc Alumni Association

External links 
  Profile at Indian National Academy of Engineering (INAE)

References 

Living people
Indian materials scientists
Academic staff of the Indian Institute of Science
Year of birth missing (living people)